Saurauia villosa is a species of plant in the Actinidiaceae family. It is endemic to the Mesoamerican countries of Mexico, Guatemala, El Salvador, and Honduras.  It is a small tree found in cloud forests, as well as pine-oak forests and secondary forests.

References

Flora of Mexico
villosa
Vulnerable plants
Taxonomy articles created by Polbot
Trees of Mexico
Trees of Guatemala
Trees of El Salvador
Trees of Honduras
Cloud forest flora of Mexico